The Dasht-e Khash, also Dasht-e Khash or Dasht-e Khāsh. is a desert in Afghanistan's Nimruz Province. The desert is adjacent to the Dasht-e Margo. It is located at 620 m above sea level.

External links

Deserts of Afghanistan
Geography of Nimruz Province